David Bardens (born 27 April 1984) is a German physician whose case was reported internationally in 2015 after the district court of Ravensburg had ruled that he should get the €100,000 prize money that biologist Stefan Lanka had promised to anyone who could provide information about the existence and size of the measles virus. This award was overturned by the Higher Regional Court (Oberlandesgericht) Stuttgart in 2016. Although six scientific publications were submitted that collectively demonstrated the existence and size of the virus, they failed to meet the exact contest requirements as set by Lanka.

Life 
Bardens was born  in Homburg, Saarland. After his service as a conscientious objector, Bardens trained as a paramedic in Mainz. In 2014, he completed the study of medicine at the Saarland University in Homburg with a dissertation on laparoscopic hysterectomy: new findings on surgical techniques, influencing factors and postoperative course of pain. During his studies, he worked as a teacher at a school of midwifery and as a perfusionist at the German Foundation for Organ Transplantation. Bardens also founded a food company in 2011 in Bremen to sell the anti-hangover lemonade freigeist. He worked after graduation for a short time as an assistant physician at the University's Women's Hospital in Homburg before moving to Sweden where he is currently a general practitioner. Bardens is also the grandson of the former German Member of Parliament Dr. Hans Bardens.

The David Bardens vs. Stefan Lanka law suit
In November 2011, the anti-vaccinationist Stefan Lanka guaranteed a prize of €100,000 for proof of the existence of the measles virus, specifically the determination of its diameter. Lanka claims the measles are basically a skin irritation caused by a mixture of psychosomatic triggers and poisoning. Bardens contacted Lanka on 30 January 2012 for confirmation of the contest and eventually provided six publications as an answer to the questions.

Legal procedures began on 29 September 2013, when Lanka declared that he would not accept the papers as the desired proof. A first court session took place in April 2014 and ended with the court's decision to halt procedures, to support its judgment with the scientific expertise of Andreas Podbielsky, virologist at the University of Rostock. The case was continued in March 2015 and ended with the decision in support of Bardens' statements.

The court's ruling received global press attention in light of the present, heavy campaigning of anti-vaccination protesters on web forums and in books. Bardens told the press weeks after the court's ruling that he could no longer appear as a public speaker without the protection of bodyguards.

Lanka eventually challenged the judgment. The case was re-evaluated at the Higher Regional Court (Oberlandesgericht) Stuttgart on 16 February 2016, where the original judgment was reversed. Six publications were submitted that collectively demonstrated the existence of measles virus and its diameter; however they failed to meet the contest requirements as set by Lanka who had stipulated that both details be covered in a single publication, something that would be unlikely to occur given the narrow focus of individual publications. Bardens commented on the case in an extensive interview on 5 May 2016 and announced his decision to appeal to Germany's Federal Court BGH. In December 2016, Bardens tried to get this ruling revised, but the court saw no reason to do so.

Publications by Bardens 
 Inhibition of hemoxygenase-1 improves survival after liver resection in jaundiced rats. Epub 2009.

References

External links 
 Posse: Gericht vertagt Verhandlung im Streit um Masernviren. Spiegel Online, 10 April 2014.
 Posse um Masernvirus: Impfgegner muss Arzt 100.000 Euro zahlen. Spiegel Online, 12 March 2015
 Germany court orders measles sceptic to pay 100,000 euros. BBC, 12 March 2015
 Measles sceptic ordered to pay doctor €100,000. The Guardian, 12 March 2015
 German Court Orders Vaccination Cynic to Pay for Virus Proof. The New York Times, 12 March 2015
 Sieg der Vernunft (Podcast). Interview on Hoaxilla.com, 23 March 2015
 One could hand the virus to Lanka on a silver platter… an interview with David Bardens" at http://positivists.org, 23 March 2015.
 Measles Virus tried at Court : David Bardens vs. Stefan Lanka | case documentation at http://positivists.org 15 May 2015.

21st-century German physicians
People from Homburg, Saarland
Swedish general practitioners
1984 births
Living people